London Electricity can refer to:

The London Electricity Board, public utility company responsible for electricity in the London area prior to privatisation in 1990
London Energy, post-privatisation electricity company for London until absorption to EDF in 2006
EDF Energy, British subsidiary of French energy company Électricité de France and parent company providing electricity provision in the London area under this name from 2006

See also
London Elektricity (born Tony Colman, active from 1996), English electronic musician